In India, an advocate general is a legal advisor to a state government. The post is created by the Constitution of India (vide Article 165) and corresponds to that of Attorney General for India at the union government level. The Governor of each state shall appoint a person who is qualified to be appointed as judge of High Court as the Advocate General.

List of Advocates General in States

See also 
Chief secretary
Director general of police
Head of Forest Forces

References 

 
India law-related lists